William Ronald Herring (born August 28, 1983) is a former American football linebacker. He was drafted by the Seattle Seahawks in the fifth round of the 2007 NFL Draft. He played college football at Auburn.

College career
At Auburn University, Herring earned letters in 2003, 2004, 2005, and 2006 while playing safety before moving to outside linebacker his senior season. He held the school career record with 49 consecutive starts, which was broken by Offensive Left Tackle Lee Ziemba in 2010. He also led the team in tackles his junior and senior seasons.

Professional career

Seattle Seahawks
He was drafted by the Seattle Seahawks in 2007. From 2007 through 2010, Herring played a pivotal role on special teams, and as a back-up outside linebacker for the Seahawks.

New Orleans Saints
After the 2010 season, Herring signed with the New Orleans Saints, to be not only a special teams threat like he was in Seattle, but to get more playing time at linebacker. He was cut by the Saints on March 12, 2013, and re-signed on March 21, 2013

St. Louis Rams
On March 13, 2014, he signed a one-year deal with the Dallas Cowboys. However, the deal was called off the next day.

On October 7, 2014, Herring was signed by the St. Louis Rams.

Personal life
Herring was among the inaugural class of 345 inductees into the National Football Foundation National Honor Society, a recognition program for players who excel both on the field and in the classroom.

References

External links
Auburn Tigers bio
Seattle Seahawks bio

1983 births
Living people
People from Opelika, Alabama
Sportspeople from Auburn, Alabama
Players of American football from Alabama
American football safeties
American football linebackers
Auburn Tigers football players
Seattle Seahawks players
New Orleans Saints players
St. Louis Rams players